Giles John Toogood (born 19 November 1961 in West Bromwich) is a former English cricketer. He was educated at North Bromsgrove High School and Oxford University.

He was a right-handed batsman and right-arm medium-pace and off-break bowler who played first-class and List A cricket for Oxford University between 1982 and 1989. Later, he played minor counties cricket for Shropshire in 1991 and 1992 while playing at club level for Barnt Green, and, briefly, Cambridgeshire, appearing at List A level in the NatWest Trophy for both teams.

In 1985, playing in the University Match against Cambridge University at Lord's, Toogood took 8/52 in the first innings (adding another two wickets in the second). This was the best first-class innings return by an Oxford bowler for 61 years, Tom Raikes having claimed 9/38 against the Army in 1924. As of March 2009, Toogood's feat remains the only example of an Oxford player taking seven or more wickets in a first-class innings since Giles Ridley's 7/110 against Gloucestershire in 1965.

He graduated in medicine and works as a surgeon in Yorkshire.
Married to Carolyn and has 3 daughters.

Notes

References
 
 

1961 births
Living people
Sportspeople from West Bromwich
English cricketers
Oxford University cricketers
Shropshire cricketers
Cambridgeshire cricketers
English surgeons
Alumni of Lincoln College, Oxford
British Universities cricketers